Psammaspididae is a family of crustaceans belonging to the order Anaspidacea.

Genera:
 Eucrenonaspides Knott & Lake, 1980
 Psammaspides Schminke, 1974

References

Crustaceans